The Communauté de communes Portes de la Creuse en Marche is a communauté de communes, an intercommunal structure, in the Creuse department, in the Nouvelle-Aquitaine region, central France. It was created in January 2014 by the merger of the former communautés de communes Marche Avenir and Deux Vallées and part of Petite Creuse. Its area is 345.3 km2, and its population was 6,635 in 2018. Its seat is in Genouillac.

Communes
The communauté de communes consists of the following 16 communes:

Bonnat
La Cellette
Champsanglard
Châtelus-Malvaleix
La Forêt-du-Temple
Genouillac
Jalesches
Linard-Malval
Lourdoueix-Saint-Pierre
Méasnes
Mortroux
Moutier-Malcard
Nouziers
Roches
Saint-Dizier-les-Domaines
Tercillat

References

Portes de la Creuse en Marche
Portes de la Creuse en Marche